Duncan Macmillan (6 January 1890 – 15 September 1963) was a British track and field athlete who competed in the 1912 Summer Olympics.

He was born in Nottingham and died in Perth, Australia.

In 1912 he was eliminated in the semi-finals of the 200 metres competition. In the 100 metres event he was eliminated in the first round.

References

External links
sports-reference.com

1890 births
1963 deaths
British male sprinters
Olympic athletes of Great Britain
Athletes (track and field) at the 1912 Summer Olympics
20th-century British people